James Maciver (born 1954) is a Free Church of Scotland minister who served as Moderator of the General Assembly in 2011.

Life
Maciver was born in Aird Tong on the 9th of April, 1954 on the Isle of Lewis and studied Hebrew and Medieval History at Glasgow University from 1981 to 1984, graduating MA. After a year at London University he took a Diploma in Theology at the Free Church College, Edinburgh in 1987.

In September 1987 Jamec Maciver was ordained into the Free Church of East Kilbride.

In 1997 he became minister of Knock on the Isle of Lewis. He was replaced there by Rev Iain Donald Campbell.

In 2016 Maciver moved to be minister of the Free Church on Kenneth Street in Stornoway to replace Rev Iver Martin.

Family

Jamec Maciver is married to Donna Maciver and they have three children.

References

1955 births
People from the Isle of Lewis
Alumni of the University of Glasgow
20th-century Ministers of the Free Church of Scotland
21st-century Ministers of the Free Church of Scotland
Living people